Leioseius is a genus of mites in the family Ascidae.

Species
 Leioseius australis Luxton, 1984      
 Leioseius basis Karg, 1994      
 Leioseius bicolor (Berlese, 1918)      
 Leioseius changbaiensis Yin & Bei, 1991      
 Leioseius crassipes (Berlese, 1910)      
 Leioseius dolichotrichus Ma-Li-ming, 2002      
 Leioseius elongatus Evans, 1958      
 Leioseius favosus (Berlese, 1910)      
 Leioseius minusculus Berlese, 1905      
 Leioseius mirabilis Nikolsky, 1981      
 Leioseius naglitschi Karg, 1965      
 Leioseius setosulus Berlese, 1916      
 Leioseius vallaensis Luxton, 1989

References

Ascidae